Francis Whitaker (November 29, 1906 – October 23, 1999) was a blacksmith in Carmel-by-the-Sea, California, where he established The Forge in the Forest. He had The Mountain Forge, in Aspen, Colorado, which he later relocated when he was named an artist-in-residence at the Colorado Rocky Mountain School in Carbondale, Colorado.

Early life
Whitaker was born in Woburn, Massachusetts on November 29, 1906. His father was the editor of a journal for the American Institute of Architects.

Career
His training as a smith included a one-year apprenticeship under Philadelphia based blacksmith Samuel Yellin followed by a two-year apprenticeship under Julius Schramm in Berlin, Germany in the mid-1920s. Upon his return to the states in 1927, he began working as a smith in a career that spanned eight decades.

Whitaker completed the five engine bay doors and inside iron handrails for the Carmel Fire Station in 1937.

During World War II, Whitaker was hired by the US Navy to teach welding at the Naval Base San Diego.

Whitaker was friends with the blacksmith mayor John C. Catlin in Carmel-by-the-Sea, California. Whitaker operated the Forge in the Forest from 1940 to 1963. He made the wrought hardware for many of the historic buildings in Carmel. He worked on the dragon-headed wrought iron grille work at the Kocher Building in Carmel. The work is the best example of wrought iron work of Whitaker in the Monterey Peninsula. He became friends with authors John Steinbeck and Leon Uris in Carmel. They both created characters based on Whitaker in their books.

He served on the Carmel City Council for 13 years helping to preserve Big Sur and Point Lobos. When Whitaker left Carmel in 1963, the Forge became an artist’s studio, then converted to a restaurant and saloon in the fall of 1970, called Forge in the Forest. Photographs of Whitaker and the original Forge building are on display inside the current Forge restaurant. He moved to Aspen, Colorado, where he opened the Mountain Forge. He gave workshops across the county and established two Francis Whitaker Schools.

In 1976, he was awarded an honorary Doctorate of Humane Letters from the University of Colorado. In 1995, he received the Colorado Council on the Arts Governor's Award for Excellence in the Arts. In 1997, he received a National Heritage Fellowship from the National Endowment for the Arts, which is the United States government's highest honor in the folk and traditional arts.

Death
Whitaker died, at age 92, on October 23, 1999 in Glenwood Springs, Colorado.

Books
He wrote or co-wrote four books on blacksmithing.

(1986) The Blacksmith's Cookbook: Recipes in Iron. Jim Fleming Publications. 
(1995) My Life as an Artist-Blacksmith. F. Whitaker. 
(1997) Beautiful Iron: The Pursuit of Excellence by Francis Whitaker 
(2004) A Blacksmith's Craft: The Legacy of Francis Whitaker. Volume 1. by George F Dixon.

References

External links
Smithsonian American Art Museum
 Anvil Magazine, 1997 interview
HGTV, "Blacksmithing Dean". Modern Masters: Episode MAS-112.
National Heritage Award
Folkways, Francis Whitaker was filmed in 1981 at the John C. Campbell Folk School in North Carolina for the Folkways series episode "Fire and Forge". The original camera tapes from this interview have been preserved digitally by UNC-TV.

American blacksmiths
Artists from Colorado
1906 births
1999 deaths
People from Woburn, Massachusetts
People from Glenwood Springs, Colorado
People from Carmel-by-the-Sea, California
National Heritage Fellowship winners
20th-century American artists